Štefan Tiso (October 18, 1897 – March 28, 1959) was a lawyer and president of the Supreme Court of the 1939–1945 Slovak Republic which was a puppet state of Nazi Germany. He was a cousin of Josef Tiso, the president of the Republic.

Tiso war born in Nagybiccse, Kingdom of Hungary.

He became prime minister (replacing Vojtech Tuka), Foreign Minister (replacing also Vojtech Tuka) and minister of Justice (replacing Gejza Fritz) of the Slovak Republic. In the latter position in 1944 he pressed for death sentences against leaders of the pro-allied Slovak National Council.

In a postwar trial, Štefan Tiso was given a life sentence. He died in prison in Mírov, Czechoslovakia.

References 

Národný (Ľudový) súd 1945 – 48

1897 births
1959 deaths
People from Bytča
People from the Kingdom of Hungary
Slovak People's Party politicians
Czechoslovak people who died in prison custody
Prisoners who died in Czechoslovak detention
Czechoslovak prisoners sentenced to life imprisonment
Prisoners sentenced to life imprisonment by Czechoslovakia
Prime Ministers of Slovakia
Holocaust perpetrators in Slovakia
Slovak anti-communists
Antisemitism in Slovakia